William Cook House may refer to:

 William H. Cook Water Tank House, Jerome, Idaho, listed on the National Register of Historic Places (NRHP)
 William Cook House (Cambridge, Massachusetts), listed on the NRHP
 William Cook House (Mebane, North Carolina), listed on the NRHP

See also
Cook House (disambiguation)